Brianna Kiesel (born July 8, 1993) is an American former professional basketball player. In June 2021 she was named Assistant Women's Basketball Coach for her alma mater, Pitt.

College
Kiesel is the Pittsburgh Panthers' all-time leader in minutes played and fifth all-time leader in points and assists. She, along with Shavonte Zellous are the only two Panthers to be selected in the WNBA Draft.

Pittsburgh statistics
Source

Professional career

She has a career 31.5% of Field Goals, 22.4% 3-point average, and 3.8 points per game.

Personal life
Kiesel completed two bachelor's degrees.

References

External links
Brianna Kiesel - WNBA
Pitt Panthers bio

1993 births
Living people
Atlanta Dream players
Basketball players from New York (state)
Dallas Wings players
Pittsburgh Panthers women's basketball players
Point guards
Sportspeople from Utica, New York
Tulsa Shock draft picks
Tulsa Shock players